Fritillaria lusitanica is a species of plant in the lily family Liliaceae, endemic to the Iberian Peninsula.

It is a bulb-forming herbaceous perennial. The flowers are nodding (hanging), purple, sometimes with a green stripe along the central part of each tepal.

Its populations occurs scattered and usually with small numbers of individuals in central and southwestern areas of the Peninsula.

Subspecies
 Fritillaria lusitanica subsp. lusitanica 
 Fritillaria lusitanica subsp. stenophylla (Boiss. & Reut.) K.Richt

formerly included
Several other names have been coined at the varietal and subspecific levels for taxa once thought to be parts of the species Fritillaria lusitanica but now considered better suited to other species. 
 Fritillaria lusitanica var. algeriensis, now called Fritillaria oranensis 
 Fritillaria lusitanica subsp. macrocarpa, now called  Fritillaria macrocarpa  
 Fritillaria lusitanica var. neglecta, now called Fritillaria messanensis subsp. neglecta  
 Fritillaria lusitanica subsp. neglecta, now called Fritillaria messanensis subsp. neglecta  
 Fritillaria lusitanica subsp. oranensis, now called Fritillaria oranensis

References

External links
Flores Silvestres del Mediterraneo several photos, captions in Spanish
Redaragon, Espacios Naturales de Aragón in Spanish, with photo
Flora-on in Portuguese, with many photos plus Portuguese distribution map

lusitanica
Flora of Portugal
Flora of Spain
Endemic flora of the Iberian Peninsula
Plants described in 1834
Taxobox binomials not recognized by IUCN